Eugene E. Parker (February 24, 1956 – March 31, 2016) was an American sports agent, known for representing Deion Sanders, Emmitt Smith, and many other NFL athletes. Parker was named by Black Enterprise Magazine as one of the top 50 influential black people in sports, and was ranked 45th in the Sports Illustrated list of the top 101 most influential minorities in sports.
For many, Parker was known to be the first African-American lawyer to pioneer into sports representation and went on to become one of the great American sports agents.
Parker, known for his integrity, is the only sports agent with an official road named in his memorial.

Biography
Born and raised in Fort Wayne, Indiana, Parker graduated from Purdue University in 1978, and graduated from Valparaiso University School of Law in 1982. In his early years, after receiving his law degree, Parker trained his former NFL client Roosevelt Barnes to be his long-time partner in the agent business and groomed another agent Craig McKenzie a fellow graduate of Valparaiso University School of Law. Parker, at his company Maximum Sports Management, oversaw 5 agents in his practice.

When Parker was an undergrad student at Purdue University he studied Business Management. He was also a four-year starter on the Purdue men's basketball team where he scored 1,430 career points (currently #21 on the career list).  He was a team captain for two years where he earned all Big Ten awards, and the John Wooden Award as the Boilermakers' Most Valuable Player.  After his college career, Parker was drafted in the late rounds of the NBA draft by the San Antonio Spurs.  He turned down the NBA ranks to take a graduate assist coaching job at Valparaiso University while he earned a law degree.  Following his collegiate career, Parker was selected for the 1978 US National Team while as a member of Athletes in Action; the US Team finished the competition with a record of 3–4, good for 5th place.

Parker then went on to found his company, Parker & Associates later re-branded as Maximum Sports Management.  His early signings included NFL All-Pro defensive players Rod Woodson and Deion Sanders. In 1995, Parker negotiated Deion Sanders' lucrative seven year, $35 million contract, with a $13 million signing bonus, which at time was highest signing bonus in history and made Sanders the highest paid defensive player in the NFL at that time.

In 2004, he negotiated a six-year deal worth $60 million for wide receiver Larry Fitzgerald, making Larry the highest paid rookie in the NFL ever. Many of Parker's rookie clients have been holdouts in the NFL. Most recently, the 2nd overall pick in the 2010 NFL Draft, Ndamukong Suh held out for 4 days before signing a 5-year deal worth a possible $68 Million with $40 Million guaranteed. Holdouts are nothing new, but this holdout was under more scrutiny due to the nature of the high pick.   The prior season in 2009, San Francisco WR, Michael Crabtree, also held out for a third of his rookie season. Parker contended that Crabtree deserved more money than where he ended up being drafted. On August 6, 2011 Parker became one of only four sports agents to ever present a player into the National Football Hall of Fame when he presented his long-time client and friend Deion Sanders into the 2011 Pro Football Hall of Fame.

Clients
Some of Parker's clients include:

Deion Sanders
Hines Ward
Richard Seymour
Walter Jones
Emmitt Smith
Larry Fitzgerald
Derrick Brooks
Rod Woodson
Aeneas Williams
Devin Hester
Cedric Benson
Curtis Martin
Laveranues Coles
Jason Peters
Ahmed Plummer
Greg Jennings
Felix Jones
Steven Jackson
Tyson Jackson
Michael Crabtree
Ndamukong Suh
Jairus Byrd
Dez Bryant
Quincy Carter
Sammy Watkins
Alshon Jeffery
Carlos Hyde

References

External links
 , retrieved April 16, 2007

1956 births
2016 deaths
American men's basketball players
American sports agents
Basketball players from Fort Wayne, Indiana
Forwards (basketball)
Purdue Boilermakers men's basketball players
San Antonio Spurs draft picks
Sportspeople from Fort Wayne, Indiana
United States men's national basketball team players
Valparaiso University School of Law alumni
1978 FIBA World Championship players